Morula lepida (from Latin lepida: elegant, fine) is a species of sea snail, a marine gastropod mollusk in the family Muricidae, the murex snails or rock snails.

Description
The squamous shell is medium sized for the genus, attaining a length of up to 15 mm at maturity. The spire sits high with 2.5+ partly broken protoconch whorls. The teleoconch has up to 6 elongated whorls and impressed sutures. The protoconch is smooth and conical.

The axial sculpture consists of moderately high, rounded ribs with about 8-9 on the first and fourth teleoconch whorls, 8 on the second and third whorls and 9-11 on the fifth and sixth whorls. The spiral sculpture consists of numerous, narrow, squamous cords of about the same size. The last teleoconch whorls has 26-28 such cords with 2 or 3 on its abapical part being slightly larger.

The aperture is ovate with a fully adherent columellar lip that is smooth apart from 2 or 3 small abapical nodules. The anal notch is shallow and broad. Furthermore, the outer lip is minutely crenulate with 5 nodules within. The siphonal canal is very short and open. The shell's colour can be described as creamy-white, light tan or light mauve, with the broader spiral cords on the abapical part of the last teleoconch whorl being paler. The aperture is (light) pink or a pinkish-violet.

At the time of the first description of the species (1995) the existence of an operculum and a radula were unknown.

Distribution
This marine species occurs off New Caledonia, Loyalty Ridge, the Midway and Hawaiian Islands as well as Papua New Guinea.

References

lepida
Gastropods described in 1995